Netechma brevidagus is a species of moth of the family Tortricidae. It is found in Peru.

The wingspan is 15 mm. The ground colour of the forewings is white, dotted with blackish brown and with black costal spots.

Etymology
The species name refers to the length of the aedeagus and is derived from Latin brevis (meaning short).

References

Moths described in 2010
Netechma